Siege of Bordeaux may refer to:

Siege of Bordeaux (1294), the unsuccessful ten day siege of the town by the English during the Anglo-French War (1294–1303)
Siege of Bordeaux (1296), the unsuccessful siege of the town by the English during the Anglo-French War (1294–1303)
Siege of Bordeaux (1359), the unsuccessful siege of the town by the French during the Hundred Years' War
Siege of Bordeaux (1405), the siege of the town during the Hundred Years' War
Siege of Bordeaux (1451–1452), the siege and capture of the town by the French during the Hundred Years' War
Siege of Bordeaux (1453), the final siege and capture by the French of the town during the Hundred Years' War